Predrag Radošević is a Montenegrin professional boxer and one-time World Boxing Organization world title challenger.

World title challenge 
In 2016, he lost to Liam Smith for the WBO light-middleweight title.

European success 
For 2018, he was named Montenegrin Sportsperson of the Year after winning the WBO European title.  Radošević would lose the European title the following year.

References

External links 

Light-middleweight boxers
Living people
Montenegrin male boxers
Year of birth missing (living people)